The Fiji women's national football team represents Fiji in international women's football. The team is controlled by the Fiji Football Association.

Results and fixtures

The following is a list of match results in the last 12 months, as well as any future matches that have been scheduled.

Legend

2022

Team

Current squad
The following players have been called up to the squad for the 2022 OFC Women's Nations Cup from 13 to 30 July in Suva, Fiji.

Caps and goals updated as of 12 July before the game against the Solomon Islands.

Competitive record

FIFA Women's World Cup

*Draws include knockout matches decided on penalty kicks.

OFC Women's Nations Cup

*Draws include knockout matches decided on penalty kicks.

Pacific Games

Pacific Mini Games

See also

Sport in Fiji
Football in Fiji
Women's football in Fiji
Fiji men's national football team

References

External links
Fiji women's national football team at FIFA.com

 
Oceanian women's national association football teams